James Harley Lauchlan (born 2 February 1977 in Glasgow) is a Scottish footballer.

Career
Lauchlan started his career with Kilmarnock making his first team debut age just 16 he went on to make 98 league appearances for the club. Following a loan spell with Barnsley in 2000, Lauchlan signed for Dundee United for a transfer fee of £100,000 where he played 96 league games over three years. In December 2003, he joined former United manager Alex Smith at Ross County, where 89 league matches brought five goals. In 2006-07, he signed for Queen of the South as player/coach and went on to make 50 appearances for the club scoring 1 goal. He then agreed terms with Dundee after being involved with their pre-season training camp in Malta going on to make 54 appearances for the club and winning the Scottish league challenge cup. Having been named as Dundee's player of the year for the 2009/10 season, he was released by the club on 4 May 2010 along with 8 other players.

In July 2010, Lauchlan signed for Sligo Rovers.A very successful 6 month period. He went on to make 20 appearances for the club scoring 2 goals going on to win the fai cup and fai league of Ireland cup.

In January 2011 Lauchlan went on to sign for Second Division Club Ayr United.
During his time he made 20 appearances scoring 1 goal and gaining promotion back to the championship.

Lauchlan made 15 appearances as captain for the Scotland under-21 team in the late 1990s.

Family
His younger brother Martin was also a professional footballer, with St Johnstone, Partick Thistle and Stenhousemuir.

Personal life
As of 2022, Lauchlan worked as a Rigger.

Honours
 Scottish League Challenge Cup Dundee 2009
 FAI Cup Sligo Rovers
 FAI League of Ireland Cup Sligo Rovers

References

External links

1977 births
Living people
Footballers from Glasgow
Scotland under-21 international footballers
Scottish footballers
Association football defenders
Kilmarnock F.C. players
Dundee United F.C. players
Ross County F.C. players
Queen of the South F.C. players
Dundee F.C. players
Sligo Rovers F.C. players
Ayr United F.C. players
Barnsley F.C. players
Livingston F.C. players
Scottish Premier League players
Scottish Football League players
League of Ireland players
Scottish expatriate footballers
Expatriate association footballers in the Republic of Ireland
Scottish expatriate sportspeople in Ireland